Arthur Serjeant (16 September 1856 – 8 October 1916) was an English cricketer. He played three matches for Gloucestershire in 1883.

References

1856 births
1916 deaths
English cricketers
Gloucestershire cricketers
Cricketers from Bristol